The following lists events that happened during 1955 in the Grand Duchy of Luxembourg.

Incumbents

Events
 12 January – A law is passed granting amnesty for crimes committed against the state and laxening denazification.
 1 March – Paul Thibeau is appointed to the Council of State.
 1 March – François Huberty is appointed to the Council of State.
 1 March – Roger Maul is appointed to the Council of State.
 24 April – The Democratic Party is founded from the Democratic Group.
 1 June – Joseph Bech leads a delegation to the three-day Messina Conference on European integration.

Births
 9 March - Yvon Lambert, photographer
 4 April – Ali Kaes, politician and trade unionist
 16 April – Henri, Grand Duke of Luxembourg
 27 April – Léa Linster, chef
 12 June – Georges Bach, politician and trade unionist

Deaths

Footnotes

References